Ora Shamaliyah  is a Syrian village located in Idlib Nahiyah in Idlib District, Idlib.  According to the Syria Central Bureau of Statistics (CBS), Ora Shamaliyah had a population of 1157 in the 2004 census.

References 

Populated places in Idlib District